Parkenfestivalen is an outdoors festival that takes place in Bodø, Norway every year in August. This has been a tradition ever since 2006, and the festival only gets bigger every year. The festival is held in a park called Rensåsparken. In the beginning the people organizing the festival only expected about 2500 paying visitors, but already the first year many more came. This year it was sold out about 8 months before it took place. The target group for the festival is mainly young adults and adults.

About Rensåsparken 
Rensåsparken is a park close to the center of Bodø. During the year the park is a popular place where people have picnics, take walks and just hang out.

Stages
This festival has several stages, the main stage, the «park-stage» and the «lairo-stage». The main stage is the biggest, and it is here you will find the most known artists. At the «lairo-stage» you will often find different dj´s, this stage is located at the top of the park, here there is fewer people and the atmosphere is more intimate. At the «park-stage» local artists often perform, some of these are well known among the citizens of Bodø, whilst other might be performing for the first time.

Development 
The parkenfestival started in 2006, and has only gotten bigger since that. The first time the festival had hoped for about 2500 paying guests, but the first day over 5000 showed up, and on the second day 7500. During the years the artists has become more international, compared to the first years when they had a lot of Norwegian and Scandinavian artists.

Parken Live 
Parken Livve is all part of the Park festival which holds concerts several times a year . Parken Live has hosted several major concerts with famous artists such as Circus Eliassen, Kaizers Orchestra and Karpe Diem . In 2013, Parken Live arrange concerts with famous artists like Wiz Khalifa, Lissie and Donkeyboy. The concerts are held on several premises like Sinus, Bodø Spektrum and Kulturhuset.

Media 
“Parkenavisa” is a newspaper that deals with everything that goes on during the upcoming Festival Park . Here can you find useful information about the various artists and bands, advertisements of sponsors, and interviews with some of the artists . “Parkenavisa” is published as an appendix in the newspaper “Avisa Nordland” around one month before the Park festival starts. In the “parkenavisa” of 2013, you can find a lot of stuff, like interviews, the tradition with drink holders, advertisements from the various sponsor and some information about the various artists and bands.

“Park festival” is a major event that happened in Bodø. The newspapers “Avisa  Nordland”and “Bodø Nu” are two of the biggest newspapers that write about everything that happens before, during and after the “Park festival”. They write about artists that are coming, reviews, and other stuff that is related to “Park festival” . The newspaper “Avisa Nordland” is one of the sponsors of the “Park festival”.

Headliners 2013

 50 Cent
 Halvdan Sivertsen
 Nick Cave and The Bad Seeds
 Monster Magnet
 Kvelertak
 Woven Hand
 Vamp
 Rival Sons
 Graveyard
 Morten Abel
 Christel Alsos

Headliners 2012 
 Jarle Bernhoft
 Hurra Torpedo
 The Presidents
 Seigmenn
 Roxette
 Daniel Nordgren
 Hellbillies
 Sirkus Eliassen
 Opeth
 Kaizers Orchestra
 The Prodigy

Headliners 2011 

 Lissie
 Robyn
 Håkan Hellström
 Motorpsycho
 Sepultura
 Ida Maria
 Åge & Sambandet
 E-40 & Droop-E
 The Hooters
 Live's Ed Kowalczyk
 Iggy & the Stooges

Headliners 2010 

 Kelis
 Thomas Dybdahl
 Karpe Diem
 Alberta Cross
 DumDum Boys
 Buddies
 Joddski
 Gojira
 The Soundtrack of Our Lives
 Sivert Høyem
 Suede

Headliners 2009 

 Manic Street Preachers
 N.E.R.D.
 The Hives
 Grant-Lee Phillips
 Röyksopp
 BigBang
 Noora Noor
 deLillos
 Danko Jones
 Joddski
 Kråkesølv (band)

Headliners 2008

 Madrugada
 The Roots
 The Waterboys
 Kaizers Orchestra
 Clutch
 Raga Rockers
 1990s
 Superfamily
 Halvdan Sivertsen
 Audrey Horne
 Lukestar

Headliners 2007 
 Odd Nordstoga & Allstars
 120 Days
 CC Cowboys
 Tungtvann
 Timbuktu & Damn
 CunninLynguists
 El Caco
 Bo Kaspers Orkester
 Nephew
 The Ark
 Chris Cornell

Headliners 2006 

 Manna
 Tungtvann
 Mira Craig
 The Sounds
 DumDum Boys
 Magnus Eliassen
 Elvira Nikolaisen
 Minor Majority
 Atomic Swing
 Kashmir
 Turboneger

References

http://parkenfestivalen.no/?ac_id=115&ac_parent=1
http://parkenfestivalen.no/?ac_id=147&ac_parent=1
http://parkenfestivalen.no/?ac_id=116&ac_parent=1
http://parkenfestivalen.no/?ac_id=6&ac_parent=1
http://parkenfestivalen.no/?ac_id=114&ac_parent=1

External links
Parkenfestivalen's website
Parkenfestivalen's forum

Bodø
Music festivals in Norway
Summer events in Norway